Veikko Räsänen (5 August 1928 – 29 December 2003) was a Finnish cross-country skier. He competed at the 1956 Winter Olympics and the 1960 Winter Olympics.

Cross-country skiing results
All results are sourced from the International Ski Federation (FIS).

Olympic Games

World Championships

References

External links
 

1928 births
2003 deaths
Finnish male cross-country skiers
Olympic cross-country skiers of Finland
Cross-country skiers at the 1956 Winter Olympics
Cross-country skiers at the 1960 Winter Olympics
People from Maaninka
Sportspeople from North Savo
20th-century Finnish people